Vladimir Pchenikin (born 13 July 1970) is a Belarusian fencer. He competed in the individual and team épée events at the 2000 Summer Olympics.

References

1970 births
Living people
Belarusian male épée fencers
Olympic fencers of Belarus
Fencers at the 2000 Summer Olympics
21st-century Belarusian people